Myriocolea is a genus of liverworts in the family Lejeuneaceae. It contains the following species (but this list may be incomplete):
 Myriocolea irrorata, Spruce

Porellales genera
Lejeuneaceae
Taxonomy articles created by Polbot